Dir (Urdu) is a city in Upper Dir District, Khyber-Pakhtunkhwa province, Pakistan at an elevation of 1420 m. It is sometimes known as Dir Khas ("Proper Dir") to distinguish it from the district. It lies at the foot of the Lowarai Pass, the main motor road to Chitral, on the Dir River, a tributary of the Panjkora River.

Dir was founded in the 17th century. It was the capital of the former princely state of Dir, until its abolition in 1969. The former royal palace is on a hill above the city. Dir was then the capital of Dir District, but was replaced as capital by Timergara, before the district was divided in 1996.

Language and Tribes 

Pashto is the main language spoken in the city.

Climate
Like most of the southern slopes of Khyber Pakhtunkhwa, Dir has a humid subtropical climate (Köppen Cfa). Owing to the city's exposed location, rainfall from frontal cyclones from the west is heavier than in any other part of Pakistan, and their passage, as well as very penetrative monsoonal periods, are usually accompanied by heavy thunderstorms.

See also
 Upper Dir District
 Lower Dir District
 Chitral District

References

External links
 Government of Khyber Pakhtunkhwa
 Government of Pakistan
 www.dirbeauty.webs.com By Syed Ziafat Ali

Populated places in Upper Dir District
Tehsils of Upper Dir District
Cities in Khyber Pakhtunkhwa